Oplodontha is a genus of flies in the family Stratiomyidae.

Species
Oplodontha africana (Enderlein, 1917)
Oplodontha albipennis (Macquart, 1838)
Oplodontha anodonta (Macquart, 1846)
Oplodontha circumscripta Bezzi, 1908
Oplodontha decellei Lindner, 1965
Oplodontha dispar (Macquart, 1838)
Oplodontha elongata Zhang, Li & Yang, 2009
Oplodontha facinigra Zhang, Li & Yang, 2009
Oplodontha guerinii (Macquart, 1838)
Oplodontha lindneri James, 1980
Oplodontha luzonensis James, 1947
Oplodontha minuta (Fabricius, 1794)
Oplodontha pulchriceps (Loew, 1858)
Oplodontha punctifacies (Brunetti, 1923)
Oplodontha rubrithorax (Macquart, 1838)
Oplodontha sinensis Zhang, Li & Yang, 2009
Oplodontha viridula (Fabricius, 1775)

References

Stratiomyidae
Brachycera genera
Taxa named by Camillo Rondani
Diptera of Africa
Diptera of Asia
Diptera of Europe